Bibi Fozia is a Pakistani politician hailing from Chitral District, who is served as a member of the 10th Khyber Pakhtunkhwa Assembly, belonging to the Pakistan Tehreek-e-Insaf.

Education
Fozia got her Master of Arts Degree in Anthropology.

Political career
Bibi Fozia was elected as the member of the Khyber Pakhtunkhwa Assembly on Reserved Seats for Women from Constituency WR-10 in 2013.

References

Living people
Khyber Pakhtunkhwa MPAs 2013–2018
People from Chitral District
Pakistan Tehreek-e-Insaf politicians
Year of birth missing (living people)